Vavau is an island group, consisting of one large island (ʻUtu Vavaʻu) and 40 smaller ones, in Tonga. It is part of Vavaʻu District, which includes several other individual islands. According to tradition, the Maui god created both Tongatapu and Vavau, but put a little more effort into the former. The capital is Neiafu, situated at the Port of Refuge (Puatalefusi or Lolo-a-Halaevalu).

History

Myths and legends 
In Polynesia, it is said that the islands were created by the god Maui, who reached into the bottom of the sea with his magic hook, caught something on it, and pulled it up to the sea surface, and it became the islands of Vavau.

Recorded history 
Don Francisco Mourelle de la Rúa, commanding the Spanish frigate Princesa, was the first European to come to Vavau, which he did on 4 March 1781. He charted Vavaʻu as Martín de Mayorga, naming it after the man who was the Viceroy of New Spain at that time. Captain James Cook had known about the islands a decade earlier, but the people in Haʻapai had told him it would be no good for him to go there; they told him there was no harbour. They may have told him this to dissuade him from going there; but Cook heeded their advice.

As it turned out, Mourelle found excellent anchoring, in Vavau, which he desperately needed, because he had failed to find a harbour at the last two places he had tried to land, Fonualei (Bitterness island) and Late. He gave the harbour at Vavau the name Port of Refuge, although his original port of refuge had been the bay on the west coast of the main island, near Longomapu. 

Twelve years later, in 1793, Alessandro Malaspina visited the area for a month, following up on Mourelle’s investigations, and formally claiming the islands for Spain.

Whaling vessels were among the first regular Western visitors to the islands. The first on record was the Fanny, on 17 June 1823, and the last was the Robert Morrison, from July through September, 1883. These vessels came for water, food, and wood - and sometimes they recruited islanders to serve as crewmen on their ships. They stimulated commerce and were significant agents for change on the islands.

In 1839, the Tuʻi Tonga (chief), George Tupou I, instituted the Vavaʻu Code in Vavau.

Geography

The Vavau island group is spread out across an area that measures about 21 km from east to west and 25 km from north to south. Vavau had 13,738 inhabitants at the 2016 census, 5,251 of whom lived in the capital, Neiafu. The islands in Vavaʻu District, outside of the Vavaʻu Group, are uninhabited.

On the south side, the island group is dispersed into many small, scattered islands and waterways.

The north coast of ’Utu Vava’u island is a raised platform of coral cliffs. The southern coastline is low and irregular, and opens out into a network of channels, bays, and islets, forming one of the best-protected natural harbors in the Pacific.

’Utu Vava’u is also home to the ʻEneʻio Botanical Garden, which is Tonga's only botanical garden.

Climate
Vavau’s climate is by far the warmest in Tonga (apart from the Niuas, which are the northernmost islands in the kingdom). Its warm climate and fertile soil makes it a haven for growers of vanilla, pineapple, and other tropical fruits.

Governors
Lord Fakatulolo was appointed Governor of Vavau in 2018.
David Fulivai was appointed governor of Vavau in July 2011.
Sione Laumanuʻuli Luani was governor until he died suddenly on 12 May 2010.
Samisoni Fonomanu Tu'i'afitu was appointed acting governor of Vavaʻu in 1988, and then governor in 1991. He died on 4 October 2005.
Fatafehi Tuʻipelehake was governor from 1952 until 1965.
ʻAkauʻola Siosateki Tonga Veikune Faletau was governor from 1936 to 1939, before becoming the minister of police, a post he held from 1939 until 1952.
Viliami Tungī Mailefihi was governor from 1912 to 1918.

Economy

Vavau is popular with sailors and other tourists, because of its scenic beauty. It is one of the most prominent tourism sites in Tonga. From May to October, the Port of ’Utu Vava’u welcomes sailing boats from all over the world and arranges for tourists to dive with humpback whales and explore underwater caves. The island is served by Vavaʻu International Airport.

Tourism, agriculture, and fishing are the main sources of income for the inhabitants. The vanilla beans grown here are considered among the best in the world. Giant clams are farmed, and pearls are cultured.

Vavaʻu is considered one of the best places in the world to catch sailfish.

Ecology
Vavaʻu is home to 262 species of plants, 11 species of lizard, 38 species of bird, and 41 species of terrestrial snail.

See also
2006 Tonga earthquake

References

Further reading

External links

Web portal service for the Vavaʻu Island group of Tonga

 
Divisions of Tonga
Islands of Tonga
Former Spanish colonies